The Baseball Assistance Team is a 501(c)(3) non-profit organization affiliated with Major League Baseball. The organization's mission is to "confidentially support members of the Baseball Family in need of assistance." The baseball family includes former players, both from the Major and Minor Leagues, former Negro leagues and All-American Girls Professional Baseball League players, umpires, scouts, and MLB and MiLB team personnel.

History
The Baseball Assistance Team was founded in 1986 during the term of Commissioner Peter Ueberroth as a way for Major League Baseball and its players to take care of former players who have fallen upon hard times. Eligibility for help from B.A.T. has since been expanded to include those with two years of service as Major League and Minor League front office personnel, umpires, scouts, Minor League players, athletic trainers, former Negro leagues players, women from the All-American Girls Professional Baseball League, former Major League Baseball Players Association (MLBPA) employees, and their widows, widowers, and children under the age of 23. B.A.T. has expanded its efforts into Latin America where they have provided help to players from Puerto Rico and the Dominican Republic. This organization was founded with the goal of helping members of the Baseball Family during times of hardship, not as a long-term program but as a bridge to help people become self-sufficient. In 1991, a contribution from Major League Baseball, the MLBPA, and the Freedom Foundation established an endowment for B.A.T. While B.A.T. was not, and is not, meant to be a substitute for a pension or retirement savings, it is able to assist in times of need.

In 2018, B.A.T. created a scholarship program for former Major and Minor League players. The program is designed to provide financial assistance in the pursuit of educational and vocational opportunities related to career growth goals.

Fundraising
Major League Baseball provides for the overhead expenses of the Baseball Assistance Team, including salary and travel expenses, which allows all funds raised to be donated to grant recipients. To date, B.A.T. has provided over 3,900 grants totaling over $38 million in assistance.

Spring Training Visits
The annual B.A.T. Spring Training Fundraising Tour is another major endeavor for B.A.T.  Since 2003, members of B.A.T. have visited each team in Major League Baseball and solicited donations, all of which are given back to former players and members of the Baseball Family in need. Through the payroll deduction program, players and coaches can pledge a portion of their salary to B.A.T. which goes directly to the grants. Most importantly, the visits also educate the players to be the eyes and the ears of B.A.T. by notifying the organization about anyone who may be in need of assistance. The teams that donate the most money to B.A.T. are honored each year with the Bobby Murcer Award. The 2018 Bobby Murcer Award recipients are the Baltimore Orioles and the Washington Nationals.

Awards

Frank Slocum Big B.A.T. Award
The Frank Slocum Big B.A.T. Award, named for the first Executive Director of the Baseball Assistance Team, is given to "an individual or a group of individuals whose exemplary service to B.A.T. has helped provide dignity and self-esteem to members of the Baseball Family." Past award winners include Commissioners Bud Selig, Peter Ueberroth and Fay Vincent, as well as Bob Costas, Bob Uecker, Ozzie Smith, George Brett, the late George M. Steinbrenner, Don Zimmer, Bob Watson, Brad Lidge, Adam Jones, and Jake Peavy.

Bart Giamatti Award
The Bart Giamatti award is given to the "individual associated with baseball who best exemplifies the compassion demonstrated by the late commissioner." Generally, it is given to a player involved in a wide range of charity work, benefiting both those involved with the game of baseball and those in the community at large. Previous winners include CC Sabathia, Cal Ripken Jr., Ken Griffey Jr., Derek Jeter, Al Leiter, Don Mattingly, Tom Glavine, Jorge Posada, Dale Murphy, Tim Wakefield, and Carlos Beltran.

Leadership

Board of Directors

President: Randy Winn
Vice Presidents: Mark Letendre, Buck Martinez
Members: Sal Bando, Tim Brunswick, Dick Freeman, Steve Garvey, Adam Jones, Diane Margolin, Sam McDowell, Alan Nahmias, Christine O'Reilly, Terry Ryan, Staci Slaughter, and Gary Thorne.
Executive Director: Erik Nilsen

Currently, Erik Nilsen serves as the Executive Director of B.A.T. Under his direction, B.A.T. continues to educate members of the Baseball Family about the B.A.T. mission, raise money, and ensure the organization is reaching and assisting members of the Baseball Family in need.

References

External links
Baseball Assistance Team. MLB Advanced Media, L.P.
Former Chicago Cubs Bullpen Catcher Sees Benefits when Money from Fines Goes to Charity. ESPN.com

Major League Baseball
Sports charities
501(c)(3) organizations
Sports organizations established in 1986
1986 establishments in the United States
Charities based in New York (state)